Seabourn Sojourn is a luxury cruise ship operated by Seabourn Cruise Line. It is very similar to Seabourn Odyssey. The ship was ordered for building in the shipyard of T. Mariotti S.p.A. in Genoa Italy. She is the flagship of Seabourn.

Design 
The Seabourn Sojourn was ordered in November 2008. The ship has a length of 198 meters and a beam of 25.60 meters. The draft is 6.40 meters; the ship is divided into 11 passenger decks and has a capacity of 450. There are 225 staterooms. The gross tonnage of the ship is 32,346. The Sojourn as well as its two other sister ships the Seabourn Odyssey and the Seabourn Quest were designed by Bjorn Storbraaten of Yran & Storbraaten Architects AS, of Oslo, Norway.

In December 2017, the ship underwent a six-day refit in Freeport, Bahamas.

Service 
Seabourn Sojourn was scheduled to be named on 4 June at London, then began her maiden voyage at Greenwich on 6 June 2010. The maiden season sailed in Northern Europe (Scandinavia/Baltic and Norway), before crossing the Atlantic and cruising the Caribbean and Panama Canal in the late autumn and winter. In January 2011, Seabourn Sojourn was to begin a 111-day round-the-world cruise from Los Angeles, to Southampton, England.

On 4 November 2019, the ship departed on the company's first ever sailing to Cuba. In total, she took five cruises to this island country.

The ship departed Miami on a World Cruise on 4 January 2020. During a 146-day sailing, Seabourn Sojourn was due to visit 62 ports in 36 countries. Due to the COVID-19 pandemic this was cut short and the ship was due in Hawaii on 18 April to refuel but no passengers or crew were allowed to disembark.

References 

Seabourn Sojourn

External links

Official website
short video of Seabourn Sojourn

Ships of Seabourn Cruise Line
2010 ships
Ships built in Genoa
Ships built by T. Mariotti